Veslemjøsa is a lake at Barentsøya, Svalbard. It is named after Mjøsa, the largest lake of Norway. The lake is located within the plain of Heimarka.

References

Lakes of Svalbard
Barentsøya